, (born 26 January 1968 in Hiroshima) is a former Japanese rugby union player who played as flanker. He is currently the coach of Ryukoku University Rugby Football Club.

Biography
Residing in the Chōzen-ji temple, in Takehara, Hiroshima Prefecture, he was a Jōdo Shinshū Honganji-ha trainee Buddhist priest. After graduating from Takehara High School, Ouchi started to play for Ricoh. He debuted for the Japan national team during the match against Korea, at Colombo, on 27 October 1990. In 1991, in order to inherit his parents' home, Ouchi entered Ryukoku University Faculty of Junior College, at the same time, joining its rugby club. At the time, the team was in the Kansai University A League A, but when joining the team, Ouchi was motivated. Since 1993, he played in the All Japan Rugby University Championship for six consecutive years. In addition, Ouchi joined Ryukoku University's faculty of letters and Buddhist studies. After graduating, he joined Ricoh. also, after retiring as player in 1997, Ouchi followed his family's footsteps and became the head priest of Chōzen-ji temple. As of April 2012, he was appointed as coach of Ryukoku University Rugby Football Club.

Notes

External links

浄土真宗 本願寺派 日照山 長善寺のホームページ
龍谷大学スポーツ特設サイト RYUKOKU SPORTS RUGBY
2019 ALL FOR JAPAN TEAM

1968 births
Living people
Japanese rugby union players
Japanese rugby union coaches
Rugby union flankers
Sportspeople from Hiroshima
Japan international rugby union players
Black Rams Tokyo players
Japan international rugby sevens players
Jōdo Shinshū Buddhist priests